A warthog is a wild member in the Phacochoerus genus that lives in Africa.  It consists of 2 species:
Common warthog Phacochoerus africanus 
Desert warthog Phacochoerus aethiopicus 
Cape warthog, Phacochoerus aethiopicus aethiopicus
It may also refer to:

 "Warthog", nickname for the Fairchild Republic A-10 Thunderbolt II aircraft
 "Warthog", service name used by British military for the UK version of Bronco All Terrain Tracked Carrier
 Warthog (Halo), a vehicle in the fictional Halo universe
 "Warty Warthog", the code name for the first release (version 4.10) of Ubuntu Linux
 "Wart Hog", a song by punk rock group The Ramones, on their album Too Tough to Die
 Warthog Games, an English video game studio
 Winston-Salem Warthogs, the name from 1995 to 2008 of the Winston-Salem Dash
 Harare International School, whose nickname is Warthogs

See also
Warty pig (disambiguation)
Wonder Wart-Hog